Jackson High School (also referred to as Jackson Senior High or simply JHS), is located in Jackson, Missouri, United States. It consists of grades 9–12 and is a part of the Jackson R-2 School District.

The district includes most of Jackson, Burfordville, Gordonville, Millersville, New Wells, Pocahontas, most of Shawneetown, and small sections of Cape Girardeau.

History
It was established in 1920. One of the original buildings of the school was called Old A. This building stood as a historical landmark until its demolition in 2017 as a result of the voter approved no tax bond, Prop J, which was passed in 2017. A new building has been constructed on the same ground that Old A occupied. The new building is made of new brick and the same limestone that was salvaged from Old A. The building consists of most freshman classes and has the highest technology in the whole school.

On completion in 2018, the new building hosts primarily freshman students and has the latest classroom technology. Jackson High School is now a 912 senior high school in Southeast Missouri with a student population of more than 1,600 students.

Notable alumni

 Linda M. Godwin (born 1952), astronaut
 Gary Friedrich (born 1943), writer for Marvel Comics
 Roy Thomas (born 1940), writer and editor for Marvel Comics

References

External links
 
 Jackson R-II School District website

High schools in Cape Girardeau County, Missouri
Public high schools in Missouri